Joseph M. Reilly (July 21, 1927 – September 23, 2012) was an American politician who was mayor of Glen Cove, New York before serving in the New York State Assembly from 1966 to 1982.

He died on September 23, 2012, in Glen Cove, New York at age 85.

References

1927 births
2012 deaths
Republican Party members of the New York State Assembly